Havea Tuʻihaʻangana, styled Lord Tuʻihaʻangana, is a Tongan noble and politician. He was Speaker of the Tongan Legislative Assembly from 2006 to 2008.

Tuʻihaʻangana was first elected to the Legislative Assembly of Tonga as a noble representative for Haʻapai in 1991. In February 2006 he was appointed Speaker, replacing Lord Veikune following his conviction on tax evasion and bribery charges. He lost his seat at the 2008 election. Following his election loss he was appointed Governor of Haʻapai.

He was re-elected in the 2014 election. During this term he opposed the government of ʻAkilisi Pōhiva, tabling a no-confidence motion in 2017.

He was re-elected again by the nobles in the 2017 election, and in 2021.

Honours
National honours
  Order of Queen Sālote Tupou III, Grand Cross (31 July 2008).

References

Living people
Tongan nobles
Members of the Legislative Assembly of Tonga
Speakers of the Legislative Assembly of Tonga
Governors of Haʻapai
Knights Grand Cross of the Order of Queen Sālote Tupou III
Year of birth missing (living people)